Pareunidia griseovittata is a species of beetle in the family Cerambycidae, and the only species in the genus Pareunidia. It was described by Breuning in 1967.

References

Apomecynini
Beetles described in 1967
Monotypic beetle genera